Clio Art Fair is an international contemporary art fair staged bi-annually in New York City, and Los Angeles, USA. It focuses on independent visual artists, without any exclusive NYC or LA gallery representation.

The purpose of the fair is to bring together artists and curators, collectors and art critics without any long term mediator.

History 
Clio Art Fair was started in 2014 by art dealer and philanthropist Alessandro Berni. The name comes from Clio or Kleio, one of the nine muses in Greek mythology, representing history. Etymologically derived from the Greek root κλέω/κλείω: “to celebrate,” or “to make famous.” 

In its inaugural year, displayed 33 artists representing 16 countries. In 2017, three years after its founding, the fair became bi-annual. In 2018, the fair moved to 335 west 35th street, New York, NY  allowing it to expand both its exhibitor base and floor space. In 2019 and 2020 the fair had been hosted at 550 West 29th street, New York, NY 10001. The October 2020 edition was suspended because of the COVID-19 emergency. the Clio Art Fair was represented by Amy Jackson

Special projects 

 I want to go home, a section about the human migration topic. Curated by Asya Rotella, and happened during Clio Art Fair March 2019. Including works of: Michelangelo Pistoletto, Gilbert Salinas, Laura Mega and PonieO, among others.
 A nest watching an avalanche, a section about the environmental care. Curated by Misha Capnist and happened during Clio Art Fair Edition March 2020. Including works of: Thirza Cuthand (Whitney Biennial 2019), Giorgio Guidi, Minjin Kang, Jong Yong Yang and Tricia Healy, among others.

Selected hosted artists 

 Vito Acconci
 Nina Berman
 Zana Briski
 John Coplans
 Thirza Cuthand
 Borinquen Gallo
 David Hayes
Pino Pascali
 Michelangelo Pistoletto

References 

Art fairs
Art exhibitions in the United States
Festivals in New York City
Contemporary art fairs